Petr Sergeevich Gubanov (born April 3, 1987) is a Russian former professional basketball player who last played for Khimki of the VTB United League and the EuroLeague. Standing at 2.07 m (6'9.5"), he played at the power forward and center positions.

Professional career
Gubanov has played with the following clubs in his pro career: CSK VVS Samara, Universitet Yugra Surgut, Khimki Moscow Region, Dynamo Moscow, UNICS Kazan, Enisey Krasnoyarsk, and Nizhny Novgorod.

Russian national team
Gubanov was a member of the junior national teams of Russia. With Russia's junior national teams, he played at the 2005 FIBA Europe Under-18 Championship, the 2006 FIBA Europe Under-20 Championship, and the 2007 FIBA Europe Under-20 Championship.

He has also been a member of the senior men's Russian national basketball team.

References

External links
 Petr Gubanov at draftexpress.com
 Petr Gubanov at eurobasket.com
 Petr Gubanov at euroleague.net
 Petr Gubanov at fiba.com
 Petr Gubanov at fibaeurope.com

1987 births
Living people
BC Dynamo Moscow players
BC Enisey players
BC Khimki players
BC Nizhny Novgorod players
BC Samara players
BC UNICS players
Centers (basketball)
Power forwards (basketball)
Russian men's basketball players
Sportspeople from Samara, Russia